Nina Gantert is a Swiss and German probability theorist, and a Fellow of the Institute of Mathematical Statistics. She holds the chair for probability in the department of mathematics at the Technical University of Munich, a position she has held since 2011 when the chair was established.

Research
Her research interests include the use of random walks to model transport in disordered media, and stochastic processes more generally. She is also interested in physical and biological applications of probability theory.

Education and career
After studying at ETH Zurich,
Gantert earned her PhD from the University of Bonn in 1991. Her dissertation, Einige große Abweichungen der Brownschen Bewegung [some large deviations for Brownian motion] was supervised by Hans Föllmer.

After postdoctoral research and a habilitation at the Technical University of Berlin, she held faculty positions at the Karlsruhe Institute of Technology and the University of Münster before moving to Munich in 2011.

References

Year of birth missing (living people)
Living people
20th-century German mathematicians
Women mathematicians
Probability theorists
Fellows of the Institute of Mathematical Statistics
ETH Zurich alumni
University of Bonn alumni
Academic staff of the Karlsruhe Institute of Technology
Academic staff of the University of Münster
Academic staff of the Technical University of Munich
21st-century German mathematicians